Ivan Alexandrovich Serov (13 August 1905 – 1 July 1990) was a Russian Soviet intelligence officer who served as the head of the KGB between March 1954 and December 1958, as well as head of the GRU between 1958 and 1963. He was Deputy Commissar of the NKVD under Lavrentiy Beria, and played a major role in the political intrigues after Joseph Stalin's death. Serov helped establish a variety of secret police forces in Central and Eastern Europe after the creation of the Iron Curtain, and played an important role in crushing the Hungarian Revolution of 1956.

Serov headed both the political intelligence agency (KGB) and the military intelligence agency (GRU), making him unique in Soviet/Russian history. Inside the Soviet security forces, Serov was widely known for boasting to his colleagues that he could "break every bone in a man's body without killing him".

Early life and military career
Serov was born on 13 August 1905, in Afimskoe, a village in the Vologda Governorate of the Russian Empire, in a Russian family. Major changes in Russia occurred during his childhood, culminating in the Bolshevik Revolution in November 1917. In 1923, when he was 18, he joined the Red Army shortly after the end of the Russian Civil War; in 1926, he became a member of the Communist Party of the Soviet Union, and graduated from the Artillery Officers' School of Leningrad in 1928. A major step in his career as a Red Army officer was the attendance in the mid-1930s of Higher Academic Courses in the prestigious Frunze Military Academy. In 1939, Serov entered the People's Commissariat for Internal Affairs (NKVD), in a major capacity.

Actions in World War II
Serov became the Ukrainian Commissar of the NKVD in 1939, and from this point onwards he played a major role in many of the actions of the Soviet secret police in World War II, helping to organize the deportation of the Chechens and people from the Baltic States, becoming Beria's primary lieutenant in 1941.

Ukrainian Commissar
Serov was the Ukrainian commissar of the NKVD from 1939 to 1941. Time magazine has accused him of being responsible for the death of "hundreds of thousands of Ukrainian peasants" during this period. Serov was also a colleague in Ukraine of Nikita Khrushchev, the local Head of State, who himself was nicknamed the "Butcher of the Ukraine".

As well as performing his duties in this post, Serov was also responsible for the co-ordination of deportation from the Baltic States and Poland. He was one of the top ranked officials responsible for the Katyn massacre of Polish officer POWs.

Deputy Commissar of the NKVD
In 1941, Serov was promoted to become Deputy Commissar of the NKVD as a whole, serving under Beria as one of his primary lieutenants; in this function, Serov was responsible for the deportation of a variety of Caucasian peoples. He issued the so-called Serov Instructions, which detailed procedures for mass deportations from the Baltic States (For some time confused with the NKVD Order No. 001223 by historians.). He also coordinated the mass expulsion of Crimean Tatars from the Crimean ASSR at the end of World War II.

Viktor Suvorov claims that in 1946, Serov personally took part in the execution of Andrey Vlasov, along with the rest of the command of the Russian Liberation Army, an organization that had co-operated with the Nazis in World War II.

Serov was one of the senior figures in SMERSH, the wartime counterintelligence department of the Red Army, Navy and NKVD troops, a deputy to Viktor Abakumov. It was in this function that Serov established the Polish Ministry of Public Security, the Polish secret police until 1956, acting as its main Soviet adviser and organizer.

Serov organized the persecution of the Armia Krajowa as Deputy Commissar, helping to bring about the Stalinist era of Polish history.

Postwar
In 1945, Serov was transferred to the 2nd Belorussian Front and went to Berlin in May that year. He stayed there until 1947 and helped to organise the building of the Stasi, the 
East German secret police.  Serov was also there to monitor and spy on Marshall Zhukov, while acting as his political advisor.

Chairman of KGB
After the death of Stalin, Serov, who had Beria's trust, betrayed him. He conspired with the officers of GRU against Beria to avoid his own downfall. Serov was one of the few senior members of the political police to survive the incident.

In 1954, Serov became Chairman of the KGB and so was the head of the greater part of the Soviet secret police. Serov organized security for the tours of Nikolai Bulganin and Nikita Khrushchev in Britain and he was decried by the British media as "Ivan the Terrible" and "the Butcher".

Hungary
Serov played a key role in the Hungarian crisis, sending reports to the Kremlin from Budapest, and escorting visiting Soviet Presidium leaders Anastas Mikoyan and Mikhail Suslov via an armoured personnel carrier into Budapest on 24 October, as there was too much shooting in the streets.

In 1956, the Hungarian Revolution overthrew the incumbent communist Hungarian government, and in response, János Kádár formed a new government that was more loyal to Moscow, which received little popular support. Serov was responsible for arresting the supporters of Imre Nagy who were trying to negotiate with Soviet military officials.

Serov organized deportations of Hungarians, one being Nagy. Serov also tried stopping The Workers' Council of Budapest from negotiating for the return of deportees and political rights, using Soviet troops to prevent the council from meeting in the city's Sports Hall. Serov co-ordinated the abduction of Pál Maléter, the Hungarian general, and the disruption of peace talks between the Red Army and the Hungarian forces.

Removal
Serov was removed from his post as head of the KGB in 1958 after hints by Nikita Khrushchev, who had said that Western visitors could expect that they "wouldn't see so many policemen around the place" and that the Soviet police force would undergo a restructuring. Serov became the director of the GRU.

GRU director
In the GRU, he was a participant in the Cuban Missile Crisis, helping the Soviet leadership with American intelligence.

Downfall
After the failure of the Soviet Union to gain the upper hand in the Cuban Missile Crisis, Serov was dismissed. In 1965, he was stripped of his party membership. Serov's downfall from power has been linked to Oleg Penkovsky, his protégé, being an officer who became a double agent.

Serov died in 1990 at the Central Military Clinical Hospital in Krasnogorsk. He was buried at the cemetery in the village of Ilyinskoye in Krasnogorsky District, Moscow Oblast.

Awards and decorations
Soviet Union

jubilee medals
SOURCE:

Foreign

Serov's award of the Gold's Cross of the Virtuti Militari was posthumously deprived in 1995 by the decision of the President of Poland Lech Wałęsa.

Personality
In MI5 files about Serov, British agents who had met him called him "something of a ladies' man," good mannered, carefully dressed and a moderate drinker. He displayed a considerable familiarity with detective fiction such as Sherlock Holmes. His sense of humour was somewhat heavy, and his jokes were broadly sarcastic and, on occasion, strongly anti-Semitic.

According to the MI5 reports, Serov was "a capable organiser with a cunning mind".

Significance
Serov, although generally considered less significant than Beria in modern literature, helped to bring Stalinism to Europe and to Stalinise the Soviet Union. Serov's consolidation of Soviet power in Eastern Europe was helped by his organization of both the Urząd Bezpieczeństwa (Polish Intelligence Service) in Poland and the Stasi in East Germany.

Cultural references
Serov makes a brief appearance at the beginning of Ian Fleming's 1957 James Bond novel From Russia, With Love. Fleming writes that he "was in every respect a bigger man than Beria" and that "he, with Bulganin and Khrushchev, now ruled Russia. One day, he might even stand on the peak, alone."

Serov also briefly features in the 1950s novel Berlin by the German anti-Nazi writer Theodor Plievier, who lived in the USSR throughout the Hitler years. Plievier says Serov was nicknamed chramoi (which he translates as "Old Cripple Foot"), a reference to a supposed deformity (presumably a club foot).

Sources
 Nikita Petrov, "The First Chairman of the KGB: Ivan Serov" (Pervy predsedatel KGB : Ivan Serov), Moscow: Materik (2005) 
 Johanna Granville, The First Domino: International Decision Making During the Hungarian Crisis of 1956, Texas A & M University Press, 2004. 
 Viktor Suvorov, "Inside Soviet Military Intelligence" (1984),

References

External link

1905 births
1990 deaths
People from Sokolsky District, Vologda Oblast
People from Kadnikovsky Uyezd
Central Committee of the Communist Party of the Soviet Union members
First convocation members of the Soviet of the Union
Second convocation members of the Soviet of the Union
Commissars 2nd Class of State Security
KGB officers
GRU officers
KGB chairmen
Soviet interior ministers of Ukraine
Great Purge perpetrators
Frunze Military Academy alumni
Hero of the Soviet Union forfeitures
Recipients of the Order of Lenin
Recipients of the Order of the Red Banner
Recipients of the Order of Suvorov, 1st class
Recipients of the Order of Kutuzov, 1st class
Recipients of the Gold Cross of the Virtuti Militari
Recipients of the Order of the Cross of Grunwald, 2nd class
Recipients of the Patriotic Order of Merit in gold